The  was an unsuccessful assassination attempt on Nicholas Alexandrovich, Tsesarevich of Russia (later Emperor Nicholas II of Russia) on , during his visit to Japan as part of his eastern journey.

Background
Tsesarevich Nicholas went to Vladivostok in Far Eastern Russia for ceremonies marking the start of construction of the Trans-Siberian Railroad. On his way (by sea) he  made an official visit to Japan. The Russian Pacific Fleet with the Tsesarevich stopped in Kagoshima, then Nagasaki, and then Kobe. From Kobe, the Tsesarevich journeyed overland to Kyoto, where he was met by a delegation headed by Prince Arisugawa Taruhito. This was the first visit by such an important foreign prince to Japan since Prince Heinrich of Prussia in 1880 and two British princes in 1881, and the military influence of the Russian Empire was growing rapidly in the Far East. So the Japanese government placed heavy emphasis on using this visit to foster better Russo-Japanese relations.  
Nicholas showed interest in the Japanese traditional crafts, got a dragon tattoo on his right arm, and bought an ornamental hairpin for a Japanese girl who happened to be near him.

Details of the attack 

He was attacked by Tsuda Sanzō (1855–1891), one of his escorting policemen, who swung at the Tsesarevich's face with a sabre. The quick action of Nicholas's cousin, Prince George of Greece and Denmark, who parried the second blow with his cane, saved his life. Tsuda then attempted to flee, but two rickshaw drivers in Nicholas's entourage chased him down and pulled him to the ground. Nicholas was left with a 9 centimeter long scar on the right side of his forehead, but his wound was not life-threatening.

Nicholas was rushed back to Kyoto, where Prince Kitashirakawa Yoshihisa ordered that he be taken into the Kyoto Imperial Palace to rest, and messages were sent to Tokyo. Fearful that the incident would be used by Russia as a pretext for war, and knowing that Japan's military was no match for Russia at the time, Prime Minister Matsukata Masayoshi advised Emperor Meiji to go immediately to visit the Tsesarevich. The Emperor boarded a train at Shimbashi Station, and traveled through the night so as to reach Kyoto the following morning.

The following day, when Nicholas expressed a desire to return to the Russian fleet at Kobe, Emperor Meiji ordered Prince Kitashirakawa and Prince Arisugawa Takehito to accompany him. Later, Emperor Meiji, ignoring protests from some senior statesman that he might be taken hostage, paid a personal visit to the Tsesarevich, who was recuperating on a Russian warship in Kobe harbor.

Aftermath of the attack 

Emperor Meiji publicly expressed sorrow at Japan's lack of hospitality towards a state guest, which led to an outpouring of public support and messages of condolences for the Tsesarevich. More than 10,000 telegrams were sent wishing the Tsesarevich a speedy recovery. Sanzō's home town in the Yamagata Prefecture even legally forbade the use of the family name "Tsuda" and the given name "Sanzō". When Nicholas cut his trip to Japan short in spite of Emperor Meiji's apology, a young seamstress, Yuko Hatakeyama, slit her throat with a razor in front of the Kyoto Prefectural Office as an act of public contrition, and soon died in a hospital. Japanese media at the time labeled her as "retsujo" (lit. valiant woman) and praised her patriotism.

The government applied pressure to the Court to try Tsuda under Article 116 of the Criminal Code, which demanded the death penalty for acts against the emperor, empress or crown prince of Japan. However, Chief Justice Kojima Korekata ruled that Article 116 did not apply in this case, and sentenced Tsuda to life imprisonment instead. Although controversial at the time, Kojima's decision was later used as an example of the independence of the judiciary in Japan.

Accepting responsibility for the lapse in security, Home Minister Saigō Tsugumichi and Foreign Minister Aoki Shūzō resigned.

The Russian government officially expressed full satisfaction in the outcome of Japan's actions, and indeed formally stated that had Tsuda been sentenced to death, they would have pushed for clemency; however, later historians have often speculated on how the incident (which left the Tsesarevich Nicholas permanently scarred), may have later influenced Nicholas's opinion of Japan and the Japanese, and how this may have influenced his decisions in the process up to and during the Russo-Japanese War of 1904–1905.

The former policeman Tsuda was sent to Abashiri Prison in Hokkaidō, and died of an illness in September of the same year. His motivation for the attack remains unclear with explanations ranging from mental derangement
to hatred of foreigners.

Later events
 The rickshaw drivers who captured Tsuda, Mukaihata Jizaburo (1854–1928) and Kitagaichi Ichitaro (1859–1914) were later called to the Russian fleet by the Tsesarevich, where they were feted by the Russian marines, given medals, and a reward of 2,500 yen plus an additional 1,000 yen pension, which was a tremendous sum for the time. They were celebrated in the media as national heroes. However, during the Russo-Japanese War, the admiration of their friends and neighbors turned sour, they lost their pensions, were accused of being spies, and had to suffer harassment from the police.
 In 1993, when the Russian government was attempting to verify whether or not bone fragments recovered from the Yekaterinburg murder site belonged to Tsar Nicholas II, a sample of the Tsar's DNA was required. Relics from the Ōtsu Scandal were examined to see if enough blood stains were present to make a positive identification possible, but the results were not conclusive.

References
 Rotem Kowner. "Nicholas II and the Japanese body: Images and decision making on the eve of the Russo-Japanese War". The Psychohistory Review 26, 211–252.
Yoshimura Akira. Nikolai Sounan. Tokyo: Iwanami Shoten, 1993. .

Notes

Failed assassination attempts in Japan
Politics of the Empire of Japan
Politics of the Russian Empire
1891 in Japan
Japan–Russia relations
1891 in the Russian Empire
Nicholas II of Russia
May 1891 events
Violence in Japan
1891 crimes in Japan